The name Summicron is used by Leica to designate camera lenses that have a maximum aperture of f/2 after 1953 and to present day.

History
The name Summicron is derived from summus, latin word for maximum and kronos, the ancient Greek word for time. In the 1950s Leica bought Crown glass from Chance Brothers, an English company and used it to make the lenses.

Leica designed a number of f/2 lenses before the Summicron, such as the Summar and Summitar. New coating technologies available after World War II allowed for the creation of the Summicron lens. The first Summicron was an evolved Summitar collapsible 50mm with Lanthanum glass, and was launched in 1953. Generations before approximately 1960 were produced in M39 mount ("screw mount"), then made available in M-mount (Latch-on A42), R-mount, and C-mount.

Description
The Summicron lenses have a maximum f-number of f/2.

Market position
Faster Leica lenses are offered with the trade names Noctilux (or Nocticron) and Summilux. Summarit, Elmarit, and Elmar lenses are slower.

List of Summicron lenses

For the M39 lens mount
 Summicron 50 mm  collapsible (1953)
 Summicron 50 mm f/2 rigid (1999)
For the Leica M mount
 Summicron-M 28 mm  ASPH.
 Summicron-M 35 mm 
 Summicron-M 35 mm  ASPH.
 Apo-Summicron-M 35 mm  ASPH.
 Summicron-C 40 mm 
 Summicron-M 50 mm 
 Apo-Summicron-M 50 mm  ASPH.
 Apo-Summicron-M 75 mm  ASPH.
 Apo-Summicron-M 90 mm  ASPH.

For the Leica R mount
 Leica 35 mm  Summicron-R 1st version – 1970
 Leica 35 mm  Summicron-R 2nd version – 1976
 Leica 50 mm  Summicron-R 1st version – 1964
 Leica 50 mm  Summicron-R 2nd version – 1977 (built-in lens hood, 3-cam and R-cam only version)
 Leica 90 mm Summicron-R 1st version – 1969
 Leica 90 mm Summicron-R 2nd version –
 Leica 90 mm APO-Summicron-R ASPH – 2002
 Leica 180 mm  APO-Summicron-R

For the Leica S mount
 Summicron-S 1:2/100 mm ASPH.

For the Leica L Mount
 APO-Summicron-SL 1:2 / 21 ASPH. (According to the Leica roadmap for 2020)
 APO-Summicron-SL 1:2 / 24 ASPH. (According to the Leica roadmap for 2020)
 APO-Summicron-SL 1:2 / 28 ASPH. (According to the Leica roadmap for 2020)
 APO-Summicron-SL 1:2 / 35 ASPH.
 APO-Summicron-SL 1:2 / 50 ASPH.
 APO-Summicron-SL 1:2 / 75 ASPH.
 APO-Summicron-SL 1:2 / 90 ASPH.

For the Leica L Mount Cine lens
 15 mm T/2.0
 18 mm T/2.0
 21 mm T/2.0
 25 mm T/2.0
 29 mm T/2.0
 35 mm T/2.0
 40 mm T/2.0
 50 mm T/2.0
 75 mm T/2.0
 90 mm T/2.0
 100 mm T/2.0
 135 mm T/2.0

References

Leica lenses
Photographic lenses